Tharam Marindi is a 1977 Indian Telugu-language drama film written and directed by Singeetam Srinivasa Rao. The film won two Nandi Awards.

Plot 
An ageing man has his daughter Chenna married to a much older man, a drunkard, because he had earlier promised that man dowry. The ageing man's son, who is progressive in nature, is against this trade and defies his father by marrying a woman named Parvati. Due to societal issues, the son is forced to set up residence in the Harijan section of the village and forced to involve himself in corrupt village politics.

Cast 
Adapted from Encyclopaedia of Indian Cinema:
 Sridhar
 G.S.R. Murthy
 Dasarathi
 Prasadrao
 G. Satyanarayana
 M. Panchanadam
 Lakshmikant
 Pradeep
 Pallavi
 Shobha as Chenna
 Rajakumari
 Seethalatha
 Satyavati
 Sudha
 Lakshmamma

Production 
Tharam Marindi was directed and written by Singeetam Srinivasa Rao, based on a story by Madireddy Sulochana, and filmed by Balu Mahendra. It was produced by G. Radhakrishna Murthy under Vishwabharati Movies.

Themes 
The film addresses rural Telangana politics.

Soundtrack 
The music was composed by G. K. Venkatesh, with lyrics by Sri Sri and Kopalle Sivaram.

Release and reception 
Tharam Marindi was released on 4 November 1977. Despite being a commercial failure, it won the Nandi Award for Second Best Feature Film.

Impact 
Along with Chillara Devullu (1975) and Voorummadi Brathukulu (1976), which also explore rural Telangana politics, Tharam Marindi constituted a wave of realist New Telugu cinema.

Awards
Nandi Awards - 1977 
Second Best Feature Film - Silver - G. Radha Krishnamurthy
Second Best Story Writer - Madhireddy Sulochana

References

Bibliography

External links 
 

1970s Telugu-language films
Indian drama films
Films directed by Singeetam Srinivasa Rao
Films scored by G. K. Venkatesh
1977 drama films
1977 films